Robert Ivan Nichols, alias Joseph Newton Chandler III (September 12, 1926 –  July 23, 2002), was a formerly unidentified American identity thief who committed suicide in Eastlake, Ohio, in July 2002. After his death, investigators were unable to locate his family and discovered that he had stolen the identity of an eight-year-old boy who was killed in a car crash in Texas in 1945.

The lengths to which Nichols went to hide his identity has led to speculation that he was a fugitive.

In late 2016, the U.S. Marshals Service, Cleveland, Ohio, announced that forensic genealogist Dr. Colleen Fitzpatrick of Identifinders International had compared the then-unidentified man's Y-STR profile to public genetic genealogy Y-STR databases to determine his possible last name was "Nicholas". In March 2018, the DNA Doe Project identified the man as Robert Ivan Nichols. The U.S. Marshals Service announced the identification at a press conference in Cleveland on June 21, 2018.

Background

Real Joseph Chandler 
Joseph Newton Chandler III (March 11, 1937 – December 21, 1945), born in Buffalo, New York, was eight years old when he was killed in a traffic accident along with his parents in Texas on December 21, 1945. Reports differ on whether the accident took place in Sherman or Weatherford.

Nichols' life and identity theft
Robert Nichols was born on September 12, 1926, in New Albany, Indiana, to Silas and Alpha Nichols, who had four boys. He joined the US Navy in World War II and served as a firefighter on the USS Aaron Ward, which was bombed by the Japanese in May 1945 off Okinawa. He was wounded in the back and hip by shrapnel and awarded the Purple Heart. He burned his uniforms after the war.

Nichols married Laverne Kort in 1947. They had three sons and Nichols worked for General Electric as a draftsman. In 1964, Nichols left his wife and sons and filed for divorce the same year. He moved to Dearborn, Michigan, where he told his parents that he worked in the automobile industry. In March 1965, he wrote to his parents that he had moved to Richmond, California, and he also sent a letter to his son Phil from Napa, California, the same month. His family never heard from him again and they reported him missing in 1965. When the family used detectives to attempt to find him in California and Indiana, they were unable to turn up anyone who knew him. Nichols worked using his real name until about 1976 according to the US Internal Revenue Service.

Nichols stole Chandler's identity in September 1978 in Rapid City, South Dakota, after applying for a Social Security card. He then moved to Cleveland, where he briefly worked for the Edko Company, an engineering business. Nichols later worked as an electrical designer and draftsman for Lubrizol, a chemical company headquartered in Wickliffe, Ohio. The company laid him off in 1997. He had claimed to have a sister named "Mary Wilson"; however, the address he provided for her in Columbus, Ohio, was fictitious. It was eventually revealed that Nichols was actually born at the same address in New Albany.

Nichols was described as being a hermit who left his home only to go to work and eat. Co-workers have said he rarely talked to anyone and appeared to have few or no friends. In one instance at a Halloween gathering in 1992, he came to the event dressed as a gangster, yet talked to no one the entire night. He also took part in behavior perceived as eccentric and unusual, such as listening to white noise for hours, and once drove  to an L.L. Bean store in Maine, only to promptly turn around and drive back to Ohio after discovering that there were no spots available in the store's parking lot. In 1989 he arrived at a local hospital with lacerations to his penis, claiming to have received them via a vacuum cleaner. He also had a knack for tinkering, and made homemade electronic devices. He had a computer that he occasionally used, which was accidentally broken by the first set of investigators who worked on the case. According to these investigators, searches related to Nazism and  "plastic explosives" were found on his computer.

Suicide 
His body was discovered in his apartment on July 30, 2002. He was believed to have killed himself about a week earlier; he had shot himself in the mouth with a .38-caliber Charter Arms revolver he had purchased a few months earlier. On his calendar he had marked down the days until his suicide, and before he shot himself he closed the blinds and turned off the air conditioning. He had recently been diagnosed with colon cancer, which may have influenced his decision to end his own life.

He had $82,000 in his bank account and had listed his co-workers as emergency contacts. His identity theft was revealed only when authorities could not find any relatives and discovered that the real Chandler had died decades prior. Authorities were unable to find any usable fingerprints to assist in identification and were able to get a DNA sample only after discovering he had visited a Lake County, Ohio, hospital for colon cancer surgery back in 2000.

Theories 
Authorities had speculated that he was a fugitive of some kind, possibly on the run after having committed one or more violent crimes. There are many theories about what he may have been hiding from, none of which have been confirmed.

Some internet sleuths suggested that he might have been the infamous unidentified serial murderer known as the Zodiac killer, as he did somewhat resemble police sketches of the Zodiac, and was known to have lived in California, where the Zodiac operated. Another theory was that he may have been a fugitive named Steven Campbell, an engineer from Cheyenne, Wyoming, wanted for attempted murder. Authorities also considered the possibility that he could have been a German soldier or Nazi official from the Second World War who had fled to the United States in an attempt to escape prosecution for alleged war crimes.

Investigators are also following a potential link to the unsolved 1989 murder of Amy Mihaljevic.

Identification 
In 2014, at the request of the local police, Peter J. Elliott, United States Marshal for the Northern District of Ohio, reopened the Chandler case. Based on DNA extracted from a tissue sample from a Lake County hospital, a CODIS profile was generated, but no hits were found. In 2016, he asked forensic genealogist Dr. Colleen Fitzpatrick to compare Chandler's Y-STR profile obtained from a tissue sample to the public Y-STR genetic genealogy databases. A match indicated his possible surname as Nicholas or Nichols. In 2018, Fitzpatrick and Press's organization DNA Doe Project used autosomal SNP analysis, with bioinformatics analysis of the DNA results performed by Full Genomes Corporation, and the use of GEDmatch, a public personal genomics database, to find DNA matches, to identify Chandler as an engineering draftsman from New Albany, Indiana, named Robert Ivan Nichols. A CODIS match with Phil Nichols, Robert Nichols' son, confirmed the identification.

References

External links
 

1926 births
2002 suicides
2002 in Ohio
United States Navy personnel of World War II
American electrical engineers
Identity theft incidents
People from Lake County, Ohio
People from New Albany, Indiana
Military personnel from Indiana
Suicides by firearm in Ohio
United States Navy sailors